Mohamed Hanef Bhamjee OBE (1946 – 8 January 2022), known as Hanef or Hanif Bhamjee, was a South African-British campaigner and organiser in the Anti-Apartheid Movement and Secretary of the Wales Anti Apartheid Movement from 1981 to 1994.

Life and career

Bhamjee was born in South Africa in 1946. He was involved in the youth movement and the African National Congress in South Africa. He left for the United Kingdom in 1965, aged 18, to avoid persecution. He came to Wales in 1972, where the Anti-Apartheid Movement was already active in Cardiff, Newport and Swansea.

The Wales Anti-apartheid Movement (WAAM) was founded in 1981 and Bhamjee was the Secretary until its dissolution in 1994. He succeeded in growing the movement to a network of 22 branches across Wales. Bhamjee's house in Cardiff acted as the office for the movement in Wales, though he was subjected to attacks, with his car being damaged and Bhamjee himself being beaten up by thugs. The network was able to mobilise demonstrations of several hundred at short notice, to protest against touring South African rugby teams.

The assets of the WAAM were transferred to Action for Southern Africa (ACTSA) Wales. Bhamjee became Secretary of ACTSA Wales and the Wales Anti-Racist Alliance.

He was awarded the Order of the British Empire in the 2003 Birthday Honours, for "services to Race Relations, the Wales Anti-Apartheid Movement and the charity and voluntary sector". In 2009 Bhamjee returned to South Africa to be presented with a Mahatma Gandhi Award for reconciliation and peace.

In 2013, Bhamjee was commissioned to write a book about the role of Wales in the fight against Apartheid. "WAAM: A History of the Wales Anti-Apartheid Movement" was published in 2016 by Seren Books.

Bhamjee worked as a solicitor in Cardiff. He died on 8 January 2022.

References

1946 births
2022 deaths
Anti-apartheid activists
Naturalised citizens of the United Kingdom
South African Officers of the Order of the British Empire
People from Cardiff
South African activists
South African people of Indian descent
South African Muslims